The Delta III-class submarine, Soviet designation Project 667BDR Kaľmar (Squid), is a large ballistic missile submarine operated by the Russian Navy. Like other previous s, the Delta III class is a double hulled design, with a thin low magnetic steel outer hull wrapped around a thicker inner pressure hull.

Design 

The technical description and requirements for a new ballistic missile submarine were published in 1972. Development of Project 667BDR was begun at the Rubin Central Design Bureau for Marine Engineering under the direction of main designer Sergeiy Nikiticz Kovalev (Сергей Никитич Ковалёв). The submarine was to be a successor to the project 667BD. The Delta III-class submarines are significantly quieter and have a higher missile section for newer, longer-ranged missiles.

The hull is divided into ten waterproof sections. The first, third, and tenth sections are emergency sections with escape hatches and transverse struts added to increase pressure resistance. A new modular freon firefighting system was installed. A solarium and gymnasium were to be installed to improve living conditions.

The main propulsion system, OK-700A, consists of two pressurized water reactor VM-4S (2×90 MW) with two steam turbines giving  to two five-bladed, fixed-pitch shrouded propellers with improved hydro-acoustic characteristics. Two back-up TG-3000 turbogenerators were also installed. Average period between refuelling and overhaul is about ten years.

The Delta III class are fitted with a new sonar system, the MGK-400 Rubikon (in submarine K-424, the older MGK-100 Kerch was installed), developed under the leadership of main designer S.M. Shelechov. The Rubikon can operate in infrasound frequencies, and contains automated systems for target classification. The Delta III class are equipped with a new battle management system, the Almaz-BDR (or MVU-JZBDR) torpedo fire control. For improved stealthiness, a new inertial navigation system, Tobol-M-1 (on newer ships Tobol-M-2), with higher accuracy, was installed. Tobol-M works with data from two observatories which are saved for two days, and also contains a hydro-acoustic navigational station (Shmeľ or "Bumblebee"), which allows the submarine to determine its position from hydro-acoustic buoys. The Delta III class includes the Molnija-M communications system, with satellite capabilities provided by the Tsunami subsystem.

In February 1973, State Rocket Center Makayev began development of a new two-stage liquid-fueled ballistic missile R-29R (3M40, RSM-50, SS-N-18). Improvements in the R-29R over the original R-29 include MIRVed capability and upgraded inertial navigation system with satellite-assisted navigation, giving the new missile greater accuracy (~), increasing its damage potential against all types of military targets whether "soft" or "hard." Fire control for the R-29R is achieved through the D-9R ballistic missile system, which contains sixteen SLBM tubes, just like the preceding Project 667BD. Coupled with the R-29R's capabilities and the performance of the D-9R, the Russian Navy possesses, for the first time, the ability to launch any number of its missiles in a single salvo with shorter launch intervals.

The submarines have four 533mm bow torpedo tubes and carry sixteen torpedoes of types SET-65, SAET-60M, 53-65K, 53-65M, or any combination thereof.

History 
The first ship of the class, was laid down on 30 January 1974 in Severnoye Mashinostroitelnoye Predpriyatie (Sevmash), Severodvinsk, as the last ship of the Delta II class. During construction the new D-9R missile system was integrated into the Delta II hull without any changes in other equipment. The ship was launched on 11 February 1976 and passed sea trials in November 1976. Then tests of the new missile system were started in the White and Barents Seas; 22 missiles were launched (four R-29PL, six R-29R, twelve R-29RK) and the missile system was commissioned in September 1978.

Most submarines served in the Pacific Fleet at Rybachiy submarine base near Petropavlovsk-Kamchatsky. Seven under-ice Arctic voyages and two along the Southern territories were completed since 1980. Under-ice voyages were very difficult. That gives only a few metres around the submarine.

Two submarines served in the Northern Fleet at the Gazhiyevo submarine base and three at the Olenya submarine base. From the 1990s all the Northern Fleet subs were stationed at Gazhiyevo.

All Delta III-class submarines passed general overhaul refuelling and upgrade in Zvezdochka shipyard, Severodvinsk, or in Zvezda shipyard, Bolshoy Kamen, since 1991, when the Soviet Union collapsed. An upgraded missile system, D-9R, with lightly modified R-29R missiles, was delivered from 1987 to 1990. On some ships the sonar station Avrora-1 was installed.

Most of the ships were decommissioned from 1995, when their next overhaul became due. Only the newest submarine, K-44 Ryazan, had a second general overhaul and refuelling during 2005–2007, which gave it a potential service life to 2017. It underwent another overhaul in 2012 and returned to service in 2017.

In 1994–2002 the submarine  was rebuilt in Zvezdochka shipyard to be a special purpose submarine of Project 09786 (carrier of mini submarine) and renamed as BS-136 Orenburg.

On 30 September 2008, a Russian Navy spokesman reported that Ryazan had successfully completed a 30-day transit from a base in northern Russia under the Arctic ice cap to the Rybachiy submarine base, Kamchatka Peninsula. The Navy added that Ryazan would soon be assigned to regularly patrol the Pacific Ocean. In July 2008, six Delta III boats were active, of which two were believed to be in the process of decommissioning.

As part of Russia's "Thunder 2019" military exercise, Ryazan attempted to launch two R-29R ballistic missiles on 17 October 2019. However, only one did so successfully while the other remained in its launch tube.

Sections of pressure hull 
 Forward torpedo section
 Battery and forward habitable section
 Command and control section
 Forward missile section
 Rear missile section
 Auxiliary mechanism and rear habitable section
 Nuclear reactor section
 Forward turbine section
 Rear turbine section
 Stern section

Boats

See also
 List of submarine classes in service

References

External links

Submarine classes
 
 
 
Russian and Soviet navy submarine classes
Soviet inventions
Nuclear-powered submarines
Ships built by Sevmash

fr:Classe Delta#Delta III
zh:德尔塔级核潜艇#德尔塔III级